Axel Emanuel Hedström (10 July 1900 – 29 January 1972) was a Swedish footballer who played for Brynäs. He was capped three times for the Sweden national football team in 1926, scoring five goals.

Career statistics

International

International goals
Scores and results list Sweden's goal tally first.

References

1900 births
1972 deaths
People from Gävle
Swedish footballers
Sweden international footballers
Association football forwards
Brynäs IF Fotboll players
Sportspeople from Gävleborg County
20th-century Swedish people